Nannothrissa is a genus of very small fish in the herring family, Clupeidae, endemic to the Congo River system in Africa.  There are currently only two recognized species

Species
 Nannothrissa parva (Regan, 1917) (Lake Tumba dwarf sprat)
 Nannothrissa stewarti Poll & T. R. Roberts, 1976 (Mai-ndombe dwarf sprat)

References
 

Clupeidae
Fish of Africa
Freshwater fish genera
Taxa named by Max Poll